Madhuca silamensis is a tree in the family Sapotaceae. It is named for Mount Silam in Borneo.

Description
The bark is greyish brown. Inflorescences bear up to three flowers.

Distribution and habitat
Madhuca silamensis is endemic to Borneo, where it is known from only two locations in Sabah. Its habitat is forests up to  altitude.

Conservation
Madhuca silamensis has been assessed as endangered on the IUCN Red List. The species is threatened by logging and conversion of land for palm oil plantations.

References

silamensis
Endemic flora of Borneo
Trees of Borneo
Flora of Sabah
Plants described in 2001